Liu Caipin, is a former Chinese politician, born in 1937 in Taiwan. She was a member of the National People's Congress.

Academic life 
Liu Caipin worked at Purple Mountain Observatory as an astronomer in China for about 20 years. She studied astronomy at The University of Tokyo during 1955, meeting her husband Kimura Hiroshi (also an astronomer) in Japan. Later, they had two children born in Japan. In 1971, Caipin and her husband decided to return to China and work in the observatory in Nanjing. Caipin had published many articles in the field of astronomy, mostly in collaboration with her husband. 

Her most cited article, Detection of infall motion from the circumstellar disk associated with the exciting source of HH 111, published in February 1997, has been cited 31 times.

Political life 
In 1981, Caipin began service as the first president of the council of the All-China Federation of Taiwan Compatriots. She served as a liaison between the Chinese mainland and Taiwan in order to improve relations. During the first meeting of the All-China Federation of Taiwan Compatriots, she convinced China to gift two giant pandas to Taiwan. She would later go on to serve as a member of the National People's Congress, playing a key role in the development and passing of the Civil Servant Law of the People's Republic of China.

Lawsuit against Japan 

Caipin had previously spent the largest majority of her life in Japan, before later moving back to China. In 1990, Caipin supported a lawsuit against Japan regarding the war crimes committed by the Japanese military during World War II, such as the Rape of Nanking.

References 

Living people
1937 births
Taiwanese astronomers